The 1996 AFC U-16 Championship was the 7th edition of the tournament, organized by the Asian Football Confederation (AFC) every two years. Thailand was the host nation.

Venue
All matches were played in Chiang Mai, Thailand.

Qualification

Qualified Teams:
 
 
 
 
 
 
 
 
 
  (host)

Group stage

Group A

Group B

Knock Stage

Semifinals

Third place match

Final

Winners

Teams qualified for 1997 FIFA U-17 World Championship

Sources
 rsssf.com

Under
AFC U-16 Championship
International association football competitions hosted by Thailand
1996 in Thai football
1996 in youth association football
AFC U-16 Championships
AFC U-16 Championships